Cory Pecker (born March 20, 1981) is a Canadian former professional ice hockey right winger. He was drafted in the sixth round, 166th overall, by the Calgary Flames in the 1999 NHL Entry Draft.

Playing career
Pecker was born in Montreal, Quebec, and is Jewish. 

At 15 years of age, playing for Team Canada, Pecker was the youngest player to play in the 1997 Maccabiah Games ice hockey tournament in Israel. The team won the gold medal.

He played five seasons in the Ontario Hockey League (OHL) with the Sault Ste. Marie Greyhounds and Erie Otters.  In 2002, Pecker was the Player of the Year in the OHL, despite missing six weeks with a broken arm. 

Pecker made his professional debut with the Cincinnati Mighty Ducks of the American Hockey League (AHL) in the 2002–03 season. He would spend his entire North American professional career in the AHL, including with the Binghamton Senators, Manitoba Moose, and San Antonio Rampage; with the exception of two brief stints in the ECHL with the San Diego Gulls and Phoenix RoadRunners.

Pecker moved to Europe and signed with HC Lausanne of the Swiss League in 2007.  He spent five seasons in the Swiss League, also playing for EHC Visp and EHC Olten.  In 2012, he played seven games for the Sheffield Steelers of the EIHL, before retiring from professional hockey in 2013.

Career statistics

See also
List of select Jewish ice hockey players

References

External links

1981 births
Binghamton Senators players
Calgary Flames draft picks
Canadian ice hockey right wingers
Cincinnati Mighty Ducks players
Competitors at the 1997 Maccabiah Games
Erie Otters players
Ice hockey people from Montreal
Jewish Canadian sportspeople
Jewish ice hockey players
Lausanne HC players
Living people
Maccabiah Games competitors by sport	
Maccabiah Games competitors for Canada
Manitoba Moose players
EHC Olten players
Phoenix RoadRunners players
San Antonio Rampage players
San Diego Gulls (ECHL) players
Sault Ste. Marie Greyhounds players
Sheffield Steelers players
EHC Visp players
EV Zug players
Canadian expatriate ice hockey players in England
Canadian expatriate ice hockey players in Switzerland